Chesty Anderson, U.S. Navy is a 1976 R-rated comedy film featuring Shari Eubank as Chesty Anderson, a WAVE (Woman Accepted for Volunteer Emergency Service) in the U.S. Navy.

When one of her friends goes missing, Chesty and several fellow WAVEs go looking for her and end up in a world of senatorial corruption and Mafia intimidation.

Plot

Cast
 Shari Eubank as Chesty
 Dorrie Thomson as Tina
 Rosanne Katon as Cocoa
 Marcie Barkin as Pucker
 Constance Marie as Baby
 Fred Willard as Peter Linden
 George Cooper as Senator Dexter
 Frank Campanella as The Baron
 Timothy Carey as Vincent The Terrible
 Phil Hoover as Michael
 Tim Wade as Ferret
 Scatman Crothers as Ben Benson
 Mel Carter as Sam Benson
 John Davis Chandler as Dr. Cheech
 Betty McGuire as CPO
 Lynne Guthrie as Lt. Ambrose
 Brenda Fogarty as Brenda
 Joyce Mandel as Suzi
 Roy Applegate as Phil
 Stanley Brock as Dr. Finkle
 Dyanne Thorne as Nurse
 Uschi Digard as Baron's Girlfriend #1
 Pat Parker as Baron's Girlfriend #2
 Betty Thomas as Party Guest #1
 Deborah Harmon as Party Guest #2
 Adair Jameson as Party Guest #3
 Pam Rice as Party Guest #4
 Murphy Dunne as Reporter #1

External links
 
 
 

1976 films
1970s English-language films
1976 comedy films
American comedy films
Military humor in film
WAVES (Navy)
1970s American films